Yorkshire House is a historic home located at Warrenton, Fauquier County, Virginia.  It was built in 1938–1939, and is a two-story, 13 bay, brick dwelling in the Modern Movement style. It features a low-pitched slate roof, a horizontal emphasis, a curved corner with continuous steel windows, a large glass block window, an elliptical bay window with steel casements and a foliated, geometric, metal balustrade on the rear balcony. Also on the property are the contributing brick and-
stucco garage, a banked stone pump house, and a frame storage shed (c. 1939).

It was listed on the National Register of Historic Places in 2005."

References

Houses on the National Register of Historic Places in Virginia
Modernist architecture in Virginia
Houses completed in 1939
Houses in Fauquier County, Virginia
National Register of Historic Places in Fauquier County, Virginia
1939 establishments in Virginia